Nicholas "Nicky" Wroe (born 28 September 1985) is an English professional footballer who plays as a midfielder, most recently for Boston United.

Club career

Barnsley
Born in Sheffield, South Yorkshire, Wroe came through the youth system of Barnsley and during a match for their academy he was sent off for violent conduct, which resulted in him receiving a three-match ban. He made his first team debut on 3 May 2003 against Wigan Athletic in the Second Division. He signed a new contract with Barnsley in December 2004, which would expire in the summer of 2007. He joined Bury on a one-month loan on 9 February 2007, making his debut in a 4–0 defeat against Wycombe Wanderers in League Two on 17 February. The loan was extended for a second month in March and he finished the spell with five appearances.

Hamilton Academical and York City
He signed for Scottish First Division side Hamilton Academical on a one-match contract in August 2007. He made his debut in a 2–1 defeat against Ayr United in the Scottish Challenge Cup, but was released by Hamilton after the game. He signed for York City in the Conference Premier towards the end of the transfer window after playing a match for the reserve side, during which he picked up a knock and so was unable to make his debut against Rushden & Diamonds. He eventually made his debut in a 2–0 defeat to Stevenage Borough on 15 September 2007. He was rested for York's Conference League Cup match against Northwich Victoria in February 2008. He missed the remainder of the 2007–08 season due to a knee problem, with his last game being a 4–0 victory against Stafford Rangers on 8 April 2008. He finished the season with 40 appearances and 10 goals. York manager Colin Walker exercised his option for Wroe's contract to be extended for the 2008–09 season in April 2008, but was transfer listed in May after claiming he did not want to play for the club.

Torquay United
Wroe moved to Conference Premier rivals Torquay United for an undisclosed fee on 28 May 2008. He made his debut in a 1–1 draw with Histon on the opening day of the season, and after starting in two further games he was dropped for the game against Crawley Town to make way for another player. However, he fought his way back into the side.

Shrewsbury Town
Wroe joined League Two rivals Shrewsbury Town for an undisclosed fee on 31 January 2011 in a trade deal, with Jake Robinson joining Torquay. He made 44 appearances and scored six goals in the 2011–12 season, as Shrewsbury won promotion to League One as League Two runners-up.

Preston North End
On 16 May 2012, Wroe joined League One side Preston North End on a two-year contract after rejecting a new contract at Shrewsbury.

Wroe joined League Two side Oxford United on loan until the end of the 2013–14 season on 10 January 2014.

Notts County
Wroe signed for League One club Notts County on a two-year contract on 30 June 2014.
On 15 January 2016 Wroe left Notts County by mutual consent.

Halifax Town
Following a successful loan spell while at Notts County, Wroe signed for National League side Halifax Town later that evening.

Boston United
On 25 January 2019, Wroe signed with Boston United. After 16 games for the club, Wroe got his contract terminated by mutual consent on 8 May 2019.

International career
Wroe was called up to the England C team for their game against Malta under-21s in February 2009. He started the game as England won 4–0. On 19 May 2009, Wroe also played for England C in their 1–0 defeat to Belgium.

Career statistics

Honours
Torquay United
Conference Premier play-offs: 2008–09

Shrewsbury Town
Football League Two runner-up: 2011–12

FC Halifax Town
FA Trophy: 2015–16

References

External links

1985 births
Living people
Footballers from Sheffield
English footballers
England semi-pro international footballers
Association football midfielders
Barnsley F.C. players
Bury F.C. players
Hamilton Academical F.C. players
York City F.C. players
Torquay United F.C. players
Shrewsbury Town F.C. players
Preston North End F.C. players
Oxford United F.C. players
Notts County F.C. players
FC Halifax Town players
Bradford (Park Avenue) A.F.C. players
Boston United F.C. players
English Football League players
National League (English football) players